The following is a list of astronomical observatory software.

Commercial software
 MaximDL
 XEphem

Non-commercial software

See also 
Space flight simulation game
List of space flight simulation games
Planetarium software

observatory software